L'unico compromesso is the first studio album by Italian rapper Gemitaiz, released on May 28, 2013 by Tanta Roba. The album represents the rapper's recording debut after numerous independently published mixtapes and features collaborations with various exponents of the Italian rap scene, including MadMan, Salmo and Bassi Maestro.

Promotion 
The only compromise was anticipated by the release of the single Fuori di qua (Out of My Way, Pt. 2), released on May 13, 2013 for digital download only. The single was accompanied by an official video, released the same day.

Track listing 

 2013 (accendila) – 2:14
 Quando mai – 2:59
 Fuori di qua (Out of My Way, Pt. 2) – 3:29
 Lo stesso – 3:13
 L'unico compromesso – 2:46
 Pistorius (feat. MadMan) – 3:59
 La testa mia – 3:20
 Mondo spaccato – 3:16
 Celebrity – 4:06
 Mettere giù – 3:27
 K-Hole (feat. Salmo) – 3:36
 Ti amo – 3:20
 Occhi di vetro (feat. Ntò) – 3:16
 Collier – 4:03
 Lo faccio bene – 3:19
 Forever True (feat. Bassi Maestro & Ensi) – 4:28
 Winners & Losers (feat. Sercho) – 4:01
 Nervemind (spegnila) – 4:00

Charts 
The album reached the third position of the Italian album chart.

References 

2013 debut albums
Hip hop albums by Italian artists
Gemitaiz albums